is a Japanese football player.

Career
Ukita was born in Chiba Prefecture on June 12, 1997. He came through the youth team at Kashiwa Reysol based in his local. He was promoted to the top team ahead of the 2015 season. He made his official debut for Kashiwa Reysol, AFC Champions League on 6 May 2015 against the Vietnam-based club Binh Duong in Go Dau Stadium in Thu Dau Mot, Vietnam. In the 85th minute Ukita subbed in for Koki Oshima. Ukita and his club lost the match 1-0.

Club statistics

References

External links 
 

1997 births
Living people
Association football people from Chiba Prefecture
Japanese footballers
J1 League players
Kashiwa Reysol players
J2 League players
Renofa Yamaguchi FC players
Association football forwards